Hans Herwig (10 April 1909 Vienna – 5 October 1967 Germany) was an Austrian film producer and director.

Filmography

Producer 
 1950 : Mystery in Shanghai, by Roger Blanc 
 1952 : Les Surprises d'une nuit de noces, by Jean Vallée
 1953 : L'Étrange Amazone, by Jean Vallée
 1955 : Passion de femmes

Director 
 1955 : Passion de femmes
 1961 : La Fille du torrent

External links 
 Hans Herwig on the Internet Movie Database

Austrian film producers
Austrian film directors
Film people from Vienna
1909 births
1967 deaths